Belvidere, also known as Villa Belvidere, is a historic home located in Angelica, near Belmont, Allegany County, New York. Built in 1804 from plans attributed to Benjamin Henry Latrobe, it is an outstanding example of Federal architecture.  The mansion was constructed for early settler John Barker Church, former English Member of Parliament and brother-in-law of Alexander Hamilton through his wife Angelica Schuyler Church.

Description  
Belvidere is a large stone-and-brick mansion with a -story central block over a partial basement, a 2-story-over-basement east wing, and -story service wing. The house contains 30 rooms and 13 fireplaces. Also on the five-acre site are a nine-sided barn and hexagonal tea house, which was built in 1806.

It was listed on the National Register of Historic Places in 1972.

References

External links
Villa Belvidere - Album of Clark Family, owners, 1910–1947
Villa Belvidere at flickr

Belvidere - Belmont, NY - U.S. National Register of Historic Places on Waymarking.com

Houses on the National Register of Historic Places in New York (state)
Historic American Buildings Survey in New York (state)
Federal architecture in New York (state)
Houses completed in 1804
Benjamin Henry Latrobe buildings and structures
Houses in Allegany County, New York
National Register of Historic Places in Allegany County, New York